Anthidium ardens is a species of bee in the family Megachilidae, the leaf-cutter, carder, or mason bees.

Synonyms
Synonyms for this species include:
Anthidium (Ardenthidium) ardens Smith, 1879

References

ardens
Insects described in 1879